responsAbility Investments AG is a private Swiss enterprise, founded in 2003 and headquartered in Zurich. Its core business are investments in microfinance companies which provide credit and other banking services to very small, small and medium-sized enterprises who have previously had limited access to formal financial services in frontier or developing countries.

Socially responsible business that seeks to be both transparent and profitable on a sustainable basis is financed. Impact investing is a general term used for such endeavors. In addition, investments are made in specific agriculture and energy companies in frontier or developing countries. responsAbility Investments is registered with the Swiss Financial Market Supervisory Authority (FINMA).

Besides operations in Switzerland, responsAbility has its own personnel in Lima (Peru), Mumbai (India), Nairobi (Kenya), Hong Kong (China), Bangkok (Thailand) as well as in Paris (France) and Oslo (Norway).

On May 3, 2022, M&G plc completed the acquisition of responsAbility Investments AG.

Founders, shareholders 
A founding partner was Credit Suisse, the second largest Swiss bank.

Shareholders of responsAbility with a total participation of 66% were financial institutions such as:
 Baumann & Cie, Banquiers, Basel
 Christian Super, Australia
 Raiffeisen (Switzerland), St. Gallen
 Swiss Re Foundation, Zurich
 Vontobel Beteiligungen AG, Zurich

Employees of responsAbility held 14% of the shares.

Other investors kept the remaining 20%.

On 27 January, 2022, it announced that the British firm M&G plc had acquired a majority stake in responsAbility Investment AG. The acquisition was completed on May, 3, 2022.

Investment products 
Different forms of investments have been made. Depending on the product, equity participations and/or loans have been granted to 540 enterprises in 90 countries. Overall investments amounted to 3 billion USD at the end of 2018.

Some products are closed funds or limited partnerships. The responsAbility Global Microfinance Fund is an open fund and has assets of over a billion USD, but is not available in English-speaking countries.

A new investment fund targets low-cost solutions to provide electricity in rural areas, which don't have connection to electricity grids. For this purpose, funds have been raised from, among others, the International Finance Corporation as a member of the World Bank and the Shell Foundation during spring 2015. The Shell Foundation expects that the living conditions of about 20 million people in developing countries will improve as a result of these investments during the next three years.

Specific investments 
Reports and information about specific activities of reponsAbility funds are available in international publications such as The Guardian, Neue Zürcher Zeitung and the Microcapital Organization.

External links 
 Company Website responsAbility Investments
 Mikrofinance.de (in German)

References 

Financial services companies of Switzerland
Microfinance organizations
2022 mergers and acquisitions